Viviana Guzmán (born August 20, 1964) is a Chilean professional flutist, composer, dancer and poet, who performs over 80 concerts a year, and has played in 122 countries. She has been described by The New York Times as "an imaginative artist". It has also been said of her that "Guzmán may be the first flutist since her teacher Jean-Pierre Rampal, to be able to establish a sustaining solo career." She actively coaches at the Peninsula Youth Orchestra. Official Website

Early life and education
Born in Concepcion, Chile, Guzmán came to the United States as a child in order to get medical treatment for displaced hips, and now lives near San Francisco, California. By the age of 15, she played as a soloist with orchestra, studied with Jean-Pierre Rampal and was featured on NBC's nationally televised John Denver music special. Guzmán has also studied with Albert Tipton, James Galway, and Julius Baker.

Guzmán attended Rice University on fellowship, first with an emphasis on medicine; subsequently, she chose music as her career path and attended the Juilliard School on scholarship. Guzmán gave her New York recital debut at the Carnegie Hall Recital Hall.

A winner of the 1991 Young Artists Auditions of Artists International, she won numerous other First Prizes in competitions including the New York Flute Club Competition; Five Towns Music and Arts Foundation and the Performers of Connecticut Young Artists Competition. She was also a recipient of the Lincoln Center Scholarship; Institute of Hispanic culture Award; Shepherd Award; Immanuel Olshan Award; Hirsch Award; Phillips Foundation Award; and the Ruth Burr Award.

Career
She has appeared as a soloist with orchestras in Wisconsin, Vermont, and Houston; the Khabarovsk Chamber Orchestra (Khabarovsk, Russia), Filarmonica de Santiago (Santiago, Chile), Great Falls Symphony (Great Falls, Montana), Diablo Symphony (Walnut Creek, California), Irving Symphony (Irving, Texas), Palo Alto Chamber Orchestra, San Jose Chamber Orchestra, and in New York City's Alice Tully Hall, Carnegie Hall and Avery Fisher Hall. As an orchestral musician, she has played with the Texas Opera Theater Orchestra, Mikhail Baryshnikov's White Oak Dance Project, and in the Broadway musical, "Sunset Boulevard" with Glenn Close. As a member of the Houston Grand Opera, she accompanied Plácido Domingo, and with the New World Symphony in Miami she played under Michael Tilson Thomas.

Guzmán has been heard on NPR's Morning Edition and Great Performances, West Coast Live, PBS, as well as on WNYC New York, KUSC in Los Angeles, KPFA, and KDFC in San Francisco, among others. On television, she has appeared in the United States and Latin America including Good Day New York, Good Morning Arizona, Good Morning Houston, Sabado Gigante, Datebook San Jose, and BayTV in San Francisco. The premiere of her music video was aired on television internationally in 31 countries on Univision and Arts Showcase Network. She has been featured on the cover of Latina Style (2003), and profiled in Cosmopolitan (Español) magazine (July 2003). Her many recording credits include the album Afterplay by Brian Kelly (2008).

Currently, Guzmán performs as a soloist with orchestra, as a solo artist, and with the quartets, "Viviana & DIVAS LATINAS" and "Festival of Four". She combines dance, including bellydancing, into some of her performances.

Discography
Telemann Flute Fantasies 1996
Planet Flute 1997
Danza de Amor (with Festival of Four) in 2000
Serenity 2001 National Geographic Compilation Album
Mostly Tango 2002
Argentine Music 2006
Meditations For Flute 2007
Traveling Sonata 2013

Publications
Contributing author, entry in Greatest Inventions of the Last 2,000 Years, by John Brockman (Simon & Schuster, 2000).
Love Soliloquies, Viviana Guzmán (Syren Press, 2002).

References

External links
http://www.viviana.org

Living people
1982 births
Chilean composers
Chilean female dancers
Chilean flautists
Rice University alumni
Juilliard School alumni
Chilean women poets
Women flautists
21st-century Chilean poets
21st-century Chilean women writers
21st-century women musicians
People from Concepción, Chile
21st-century flautists